Antoine Compagnon (born 20 July 1950 in Brussels, Belgium) is a Professor of French Literature at Collège de France, Paris (2006–), and the Blanche W. Knopf Professor of French and Comparative Literature at Columbia University, New York City (1985–).

Education
Compagnon studied at École Polytechnique (1970) and École nationale des Ponts et Chaussées (1975), and holds a Doctorate of Paris Diderot University (1985).

Career
Compagnon was a Fellow of the Fondation Thiers (1975-1978), taught at École Polytechnique (1978-1985), Institut français du Royaume-Uni, London (1980-1981), University of Rouen (1981-1985), was a visiting professor at the University of Pennsylvania, Philadelphia (1986, 1990), Fellow of the John Simon Guggenheim Memorial Foundation (1988), Professor at University of Maine (France), Le Mans (1989-1990), visiting fellow at All Souls College, Oxford (1994), Professor at Paris-Sorbonne University (1994-2006).

He is a Fellow of the American Academy of Arts and Sciences (1997) and Academia Europaea (2006), and a Corresponding Fellow of the British Academy (2009). He received an Honorary Degree of King's College London (2010), HEC Paris (2012), and University of Liège (2013), and the Claude Lévi-Strauss Prize of the Académie des sciences morales et politiques (2011).

In 2012, Compagnon did a daily broadcast on France Inter, Un été avec Montaigne. The programme was published as a book which became a bestseller in 2013. He has done several more Un été avec series, including Un été avec Baudelaire in 2014. In 2013, he curated a show of Proust's manuscripts from the Bibliothèque nationale de France at the Morgan Library.

Publications
 La Seconde Main ou le travail de la citation (Seuil, 1979).
 Le Deuil antérieur (Seuil, 1979).
 Nous, Michel de Montaigne (Seuil, 1980).
 La Troisième République des Lettres (Seuil, 1983).
 Ferragosto (Flammarion, 1985).
 Proust entre deux siècles (Seuil, 1989).
 Les Cinq Paradoxes de la modernité (Seuil, 1990).
 L’Esprit de l’Europe (Flammarion, 1993).
 Chat en poche. Montaigne et l’allégorie (Seuil, 1993).
 Connaissez-vous Brunetière ? (Seuil, 1997).
 Le Démon de la théorie (Seuil, 1998).
 Baudelaire devant l’innombrable (PUPS, 2003).
 Les Antimodernes, de Joseph de Maistre à Roland Barthes (Gallimard, 2005).
 La Littérature, pour quoi faire ? (Collège de France / Fayard, 2007).
 Que reste-t-il de la culture française ? (Denoël, 2008).
 Le Cas Bernard Faÿ. Du Collège de France à l’indignité nationale (Gallimard, 2009).
 La Classe de rhéto (Gallimard, 2012).
 Un été avec Montaigne (Équateurs / France Inter, 2013).
 Une question de discipline. Entretiens avec Jean-Baptiste Amadieu (Flammarion, 2013).
 Baudelaire l’irréductible (Flammarion, 2014).
 Un été avec Baudelaire (Équateurs / France Inter, 2015).
 Petits Spleens numériques (Équateurs, 2015).
 L’Âge des lettres (Gallimard, 2015).
 Un été avec Pascal (Équateurs / France Inter, 2020).
 Un été avec Colette (Équateurs / France Inter, 2022).

Compagnon edited Marcel Proust, Du côté de chez Swann (Gallimard, Folio, 1988), Sodome et Gomorrhe (Gallimard, Pléiade, 1988; Folio, 1989), Carnets, in collaboration (Gallimard, 2002); Albert Thibaudet, Réflexions sur la politique (Robert Laffont, Bouquins, 2007), Réflexions sur la littérature (Gallimard, Quarto, 2007); Charles Péguy, L’Argent (Équateurs, 2008); Paul Bourget, Le Disciple (Le Livre de Poche, 2010); Maurice Barrès, Mes cahiers (Équateurs, 2010).

Many of Compagnon's publications are translated in English and other languages.

References

1950 births
Living people
École Polytechnique alumni
Columbia University faculty
Academic staff of the Collège de France
Fellows of the American Academy of Arts and Sciences
Corresponding Fellows of the British Academy
Members of the Académie Française
People from Brussels